Leslie-Taylor House, also known as Maple Lawn, is a historic home located at Vass, Moore County, North Carolina. It was built about 1879, and is a three-story, double pile frame dwelling with Late Victorian style decorative elements.  It has a clipped gable roof and features three steep Gothic gables with ornate sawn bargeboards. It has a nearly full-width front porch with rooftop balcony. Also on the property are the contributing smokehouse and carriage house.

It was added to the National Register of Historic Places in 2008.

References

Houses on the National Register of Historic Places in North Carolina
Victorian architecture in North Carolina
Houses completed in 1879
Houses in Moore County, North Carolina
National Register of Historic Places in Moore County, North Carolina